Dillon is an Irish surname of Breton origin, descending from a cadet branch of Viscomte de Leon in Northern Brittany. It first appeared in Ireland with the arrival of Sir Henry de Leon, in the service of Prince John in 1185. Sir Henry married Maud de Courcy, daughter of Sir John de Courcy and Affrica Guðrøðardóttir. Awarded large tracts of land by in Meath and Westmeath, one of the Dillons’ first Mott & Baileys can still be found at Dunnamona before the establishment of stone structures such as Portlick Castle.

The name evolved into the Irish-language "Diolun"/English-language "Dillon" (not to be confused with the Welsh given name Dylan). It is particularly common in the Meath and Westmeath counties of Ireland where the Dillons were granted vast areas of land. The name is widespread throughout Ireland. The Dillon family later became the Barons Clonbrock and Earls of Roscommon. The family in Ireland was honoured with six compositions (music & poetry) composed by Turlough Carolan: Tiarna Duilleain – Lord Dillon; Róis Duilleain – Lady Rose Dillon jig; Gearalt Duilleain – Gerald Dillon; Fainní Duilleain – Fanny Dillon; Comhairleoir Duilleain – Coun. Dillon; Lúcás Ó Duilleain – Luke Dillon..

Notable people with the surname "Dillon" include

A
A. J. Dillon (born 1998), American football player
Alan Dillon (born 1982), Irish politician
Alfred Dillon (1841–1915), New Zealand politician
Sir Andrew Dillon (born 1954), English health executive
Andy Dillon (born 1962), American politician
Ann Turner Dillon, American political figure
Antron Dillon (born 1985), American football player
Arthur Dillon (disambiguation), multiple people
Artie Dillon (1894–1948), Australian rules footballer
Asia Kate Dillon (born 1984), American actor
Austin Dillon (born 1990), American race car driver

B
Barbara Dillon, American author
Bartholomew Dillon (??–1533), Irish judge
Bernard Dillon (1888–1941), Irish jockey
Bethany Dillon (born 1988), American musician
Bill Dillon (disambiguation), multiple people
Bobby Dillon (1930–2019), American football player
Brandon Dillon (born 1972), American politician
Brandon Dillon (American football) (born 1997), American football player
Brenden Dillon (born 1990), Canadian ice hockey player
Brian Dillon (1830–1872), Irish activist
Brian Dillon (judge) (1925–2003), British lawyer

C
Cara Dillon (born 1975), Northern Irish folk singer
Carey Dillon (1627–1689), Irish nobleman
Carmen Dillon (1908–2000), English art director
Cass Dillon (born 1986), American singer-songwriter
C. Douglas Dillon (1909–2003), American politician
Cecil Dillon (1908–1969), Canadian-American ice hockey player
Cecily Dillon (1603–1653), Irish nun
Charles Dillon (disambiguation), multiple people
Chester Dillon (1887–1972), American football player
Chris Dillon (born 1965), American attorney
Cian Dillon (born 1988), Irish hurler
Clarence Dillon (1882–1979), American businessman
Constantine Dillon (1813–1853), English army officer
Corey Dillon (born 1974), American football player
Costa Dillon (born 1953), American writer and actor

D
Danica Dillon, American pornographic actress
Daniel Dillon (disambiguation), multiple people
David Dillon (disambiguation), multiple people
Dean Dillon (born 1955), American musician
Denis E. Dillon (1933–2010), American politician
Denise Dillon (born 1973), American basketball player and coach
Dennis Anthony Dillon (born 1959), American minister
Denny Dillon (born 1951), American actress
Derrick Dillon (born 1995), American football player
Des Dillon (disambiguation), multiple people
Doug Dillon (1924–1999), New Zealand lawyer

E
Éamonn Dillon (born 1992), Irish hurler
Edmund Dillon (born 1955), Trinidadian military officer
Edward Dillon (disambiguation), multiple people
Eilís Dillon (1920–1994), Irish author
E. J. Dillon (1854–1933), Irish author
Eleanor Dillon (1601–1629), Irish nun
Elizabeth Dillon (disambiguation), multiple people
Emer Dillon (born 1984), Irish camogie player
Enrica Clay Dillon (1885–1946), American opera singer
Eoin Dillon (born 1987), Irish hurler
Eric Dillon (1881–1946), Irish soldier

F
Fannie Charles Dillon (1881–1947), American pianist
Fanny Dillon (1785–1836), French noblewoman
Francis R. Dillon, American general
Frank Dillon (1873–1931), American baseball player
Frank J. Dillon (1867–1954), American artist

G
Gareth Dillon, Irish Gaelic footballer
Garrett Dillon (1640–1696), Irish politician
Gary Dillon (born 1959), Canadian ice hockey player
Gary P. Dillon (born 1943), American politician
George Dillon (disambiguation), multiple people
Geraldine Dillon (1936–2020), Australian chef
Geraldine Plunkett Dillon (1891–1986), Irish activist
Gerard Dillon (1916–1971), Irish artist
Gerard B. Dillon (born 1962), Irish politician
Glyn Dillon (born 1971), British costume designer
Griffin Dillon (born 2003), American soccer player
Gus Dillon (1881–1952), Canadian lacrosse player

H
Harold Dillon (1844–1932), English antiquary
Helen Dillon (born 1940), Scottish gardener
Henry Dillon (disambiguation), multiple people
Herman Dillon (1931–2004), American tribal leader
Hook Dillon (1924–2004), American basketball player
H. S. Dillon (1945–2019), Indonesian politician
Hugh Dillon (born 1963), Canadian musician and actor

J
Jack Dillon (1891–1942), American boxer
Jake Dillon (born 1993), Irish hurler
James Dillon (disambiguation), multiple people
Jane Dillon, British designer
Jen O'Malley Dillon (born 1976), American political strategist
Jerome Dillon (born 1969), American musician
Jessica Dillon (born 1995), Australian footballer
Jimmy Dillon (born 1978/1979), American politician
J. J. Dillon (born 1942), American professional wrestler
Joan Dillon (born 1935), American-French royal
Joan Dillon (historic preservation activist) (1925–2008), American activist
Joe Dillon (born 1975), American baseball player
Joey Dillon (born 1992), American soccer player
Joey Rocketshoes Dillon, American historian
John Dillon (disambiguation), multiple people
Joseph E. Dillon (1921–1990), American politician
Josephine Dillon (1884–1971), American actress
Julia Dillon (disambiguation), multiple people
Julie Dillon (born 1982), American illustrator

K
Karen Dillon (journalist) (born 1952), American journalist
Karen Dillon (filmmaker), American filmmaker
Kathleen Dillon (1898–1980), British theatre designer
Keir Dillon (born 1977), American snowboarder
Kevin Dillon (disambiguation), multiple people
Kirsty Dillon (born 1976), English actress
K. J. Dillon (born 1993), American football player
Kurt Dillon (born 1994), Australian rugby league footballer
Kym Dillon (born 1959), Australian television presenter

L
Lawrence Dillon (born 1959), American composer
Linda Dillon (born 1978), Northern Irish politician
Lisa Dillon (born 1979), English actress
Lucas Dillon (disambiguation), multiple people
Lucy Dillon (born 1974), British writer
Luke Dillon (disambiguation), multiple people

M
Marshall Dillon (cricketer) (1925–1979), Australian cricketer
Martin Dillon (disambiguation), multiple people
Mary Dillon (disambiguation), multiple people
Matt Dillon (disambiguation), multiple people
Matthew Dillon (born 1966), American software engineer
Melinda Dillon (1939–2023), American actress
Merton L. Dillon (1924–2003), American historian and author
Mervyn Dillon (born 1974), West Indian cricketer
Mia Dillon (born 1955), American actress
Michelle Dillon (born 1973), British triathlete
Michael Dillon (disambiguation), multiple people
Millicent Dillon (born 1925), American writer
Myles Dillon (1900–1972), Irish historian

N
Nicholas Dillon (born 1997), Trinidadian footballer

O
Oliver Dillon (born 1998), English actor
Olivia Dillon (born 1973), Irish cyclist
Oskar Dillon (born 1999), Australian rules footballer

P
Pa Dillon (1938–2013), Irish hurler
Packy Dillon (1853–1902), American baseball player
Patricia Dillon, American politician
Patrick Dillon (1832–1868), Irish-American priest
Patrick Joseph Dillon (1841–1889), Irish priest
Paul Dillon, American actor
Paul Dillon (footballer) (born 1978), Irish footballer
Peter Dillon (1788–1847), English merchant
Phyllis Dillon (1944–2004), Jamaican singer

R
Ricardo Dillon (born 1964), Argentine football manager
Richard C. Dillon (1877–1966), American politician
Ricky Dillon (born 1992), American singer-songwriter
Robert Dillon (disambiguation), multiple people
Ron Dillon Jr. (born 1975), American politician
Rosie Dillon (born 1996), Australian rules footballer
Ross Dillon (born 1947), Australian rules footballer
Ryan Dillon (born 1988), American puppeteer

S
Sandy Dillon, American singer-songwriter
Sarinder Singh Dillon (born 1946), Hong Kong field hockey player
Scott Dillon (1928–2018), Australian surfer
Sean Dillon (disambiguation), multiple people
Shaun Dillon (born 1984), Scottish footballer
Sheila Dillon, British journalist
Sheri Dillon, American attorney
Sidney Dillon (1812–1892), American railroad executive
Siobhan Dillon (born 1984), English actress
Steven Dillon (disambiguation), multiple people

T
Ted Dillon (1881–1941), English cricketer
Terence Dillon (born 1964), British rower
Terry Dillon (1941–1964), American football player
Theobald Dillon (??–1624), Irish military commander
Théobald Dillon (1745–1792), Irish general
Thomas Dillon (disambiguation), multiple people
Tim Dillon (disambiguation), multiple people
Todd Dillon (born 1962), American football player
Ty Dillon (born 1992), American race car driver

U
Una Dillon (1903–1993), British bookseller

V
Veer Singh Dillon (1792–1842), Indian general
Vince Dillon (1923–2005), English footballer
Vincent Dillon (??–1651), Irish martyr

W
Wayne Dillon (born 1955), Canadian ice hockey player
Wentworth Dillon (1637–1685), Irish poet and landlord
William Dillon (disambiguation), multiple people

See also
Viscount Dillon, an Irish peerage title
Attorney General Dillon (disambiguation), a disambiguation page for Attorney Generals surnamed "Dillon"
General Dillon (disambiguation), a disambiguation page for Generals surnamed "Dillon"
Justice Dillon (disambiguation), a disambiguation page for Justices surnamed "Dillon"
Senator Dillon (disambiguation), a disambiguation page for Senators surnamed "Dillon"
Dillon (disambiguation), a disambiguation page for "Dillon"
Dillon (given name), a page for people with the given name "Dillon"
Dylan (name), a page for people with the given name "Dylan"

References
 

Irish families
Surnames of Irish origin
Anglicised Irish-language surnames
English-language surnames